The Taoyuan City Council (TYCC) is the elected municipal council of Taoyuan City, Republic of China (Taiwan). The council composes of 60 councillors elected once every four years by single non-transferable vote, most recently in the 2022 Taiwanese local elections on 26 November 2022.

History
The council was established on 21 January 1951 as Taoyuan County Council. On 25 December 2014, the council was promoted in status to Taoyuan City Council after Taoyuan County becomes a special municipality.

Current composition 

Since the local elections in 2022, the council was composed as follows:

Organization

Committees
 First Examination Team
 Second Examination Team
 Third Examination Team
 Fourth Examination Team
 Fifth Examination Team
 Sixth Examination Team
 Procedural Examination Team
 Discipline Committee

Departments
 Agenda Procedure Division
 General Affairs Division
 Legal Affairs Office
 Information and Library Office
 Public Relationship Office
 Accounting Office
 Personnel Office

Speakers

Taoyuan County Council
 Tseng Chung-yi (2002-2010)
 Chi Yi-sheng (2010-2014)

Taoyuan City Council
 Chi Yi-sheng (2014-)

See also
 Taoyuan City Government

References

External links

 

 
1951 establishments in Taiwan
City councils in Taiwan
Taoyuan District